Tillandsia tectorum is a species of flowering plant in the genus Tillandsia. It is native to Peru and Ecuador.

Cultivars 
 Tillandsia 'Enano'
 Tillandsia 'Sweet Isabel'

References 

tectorum
Flora of Peru
Flora of Ecuador
Plants described in 1877